Swedish YouTuber Felix Kjellberg, known online as PewDiePie, has uploaded over 4,400 videos on the YouTube platform. Having accumulated over 28 billion video views, PewDiePie's channel ranks as the 30th-most-viewed on YouTube. Due to PewDiePie's YouTube channel being the fifth-most-subscribed on the platform, and the most-subscribed by an individual creator, his channel's videos attracted substantial media coverage. 

According to Social Blade–a website which tracks YouTube channel statistics–on 29 December 2014, the PewDiePie channel surpassed emimusic's video view count, at over 7.2 billion views, to become the most-viewed channel on the website. PewDiePie's channel has reached various video view milestones; one which received considerable media coverage was it becoming the first to reach 10 billion views on 6 September 2015. PewDiePie's channel held the distinction of being the most-viewed on the platform until 14 February 2017, when it was surpassed by T-Series, according to Social Blade.

PewDiePie's first video on the eponymous channel was deleted and is no longer available for public viewing; in a 2017 interview conducted by one of his friends, PewDiePie expressed he no longer has access to the video. The oldest PewDiePie video available for public viewing on YouTube is "Minecraft Multiplayer Fun", published on 2 October 2010. , the video has accumulated over 18 million video views. The most-viewed video uploaded by PewDiePie is the music video "bitch lasagna", published on 5 October 2018. , the video has accumulated over 300 million views.

Most viewed videos

All-time list

By year of upload

Selected videography

Inclusion criteria 
Pewdiepie has released over 4,400 videos on his YouTube channel since it was created. This is a selected videography listing the videos on his channel that have received non-trivial coverage from reliable third-party sources.

2010–14

2015–19

2020–present

Collaborative videography

Other videography

See also
List of most-viewed YouTube channels
List of diss tracks § YouTube
Scare PewDiePie – Episodes

Notes

References
References

Primary video and playlist sources
In the text these references are preceded by a double dagger (‡):

Further reading

2010s YouTube videos
2020s YouTube videos
Videography
Videographies of YouTubers
Video game video content
Works banned in China